The Agricultural Museum is a museum in Cairo, Egypt.

History and profile
The Palace of Princess Fatima, the daughter of Khedive Ismail, was chosen to be remodeled to house the museum, and construction of the museum started in November 1930. During the planning of the museum the director of Hungary's Royal Agricultural Museum directed the work. A Hungarian national, Ivan Nagy, was the first director of the museum which was opened in 1938. It was the first agricultural museum in the world (after the Hungarian museum).

The museum is made up of separate museums: the museum of Ancient Egyptian agriculture; museum of scientific models; museum of plant wealth; Syria
museum; the Greek, Roman, Coptic, and Islamic museum; and the cotton museum. In addition to the museum buildings there are also gardens with trees and rare plants and greenhouses.

References

External links 
 Official website

1938 establishments in Egypt
Museums established in 1938
Museums in Cairo
Agriculture museums in Egypt
History museums in Egypt
Agriculture in Egypt